Daržbalys (formerly ) is a village in Kėdainiai district municipality, in Kaunas County, in central Lithuania. According to the 2011 census, the village was uninhabited. The Šernupis rivulet runs through the village.

The name means 'a puddle (bala) of a potager (daržas).'

Demography

References

Villages in Kaunas County
Kėdainiai District Municipality